The following lists events that happened during 1992 in the Grand Duchy of Luxembourg.

Incumbents

Events

January – March
 1 January – Radio Luxembourg shuts down its English language terrestrial signal on 208 MW.
 7 February – The Maastricht Treaty is signed.
 16 February – Marc Girardelli wins the silver medal in the men's Super G at the 1992 Winter Olympics.
 18 February – Girardelli wins another Olympic silver medal, this time in the men's Giant Slalom.

April – June
 13 March – Carole Reding wins Miss Luxembourg.
 9 April – ARBED acquires the former East German Maxhütte, which it is to reconstitute as Stahlwerk Thüringen.
 9 May – Representing Luxembourg, Marion Welter finishes twenty-first in the Eurovision Song Contest 1992 with the song Sou frai.
 12 June – Luxembourg signs the United Nations Framework Convention on Climate Change in Rio de Janeiro.
 14 June – France's Jean-Philippe Dojwa wins the 1992 Tour de Luxembourg.

July – September
 10 August – P&TLuxembourg is created as a government-owned corporation.

October – December
 22 November – The Action Committee 5/6 changes its name to 'Action Committee for Democracy and Pensions Justice'.
 9 December – René Steichen resigns from the cabinet, and is replaced by Marie-Josée Jacobs.
 12 December – At a Council of Ministers meeting in Edinburgh, it is decided that Luxembourg City will remain one of the three seats of the European Union.
 30 December – Radio Luxembourg shuts down its English language satellite signal, putting an end to its English coverage.

Births
 16 April – Prince Sébastien of Luxembourg
 9 May - Tom Laterza, footballer
 1 August – Prince Carl-Johan of Nassau
 22 September - Bob Jungels, road bicycle racer

Deaths
 27 February – Antoine Wehenkel, politician
 7 July – Josy Barthel, athlete and politician

References

 
Years of the 20th century in Luxembourg
Luxembourg